is a town located in Gifu, Japan. , the town had an estimated population of 19,361 and a population density of 1000 persons per km2, in 6998 households.

Geography
Gōdo is located in the northwestern portion of the  Nōbi Plain in southwestern Gifu Prefecture. The town has a climate characterized by characterized by hot and humid summers, and mild winters  (Köppen climate classification Cfa).  The average annual temperature in Gōdo is 15.2 °C. The average annual rainfall is 1952 mm with September as the wettest month. The temperatures are highest on average in August, at around 27.6 °C, and lowest in January, at around 3.9 °C.

Neighbouring municipalities
Gifu Prefecture
Ōgaki
Ōno
Mizuho
Ikeda

Demographics
Per Japanese census data, the population of Gōdo peaked around the year 2000 and has declined slightly since.

History
The area around Gōdo was part of traditional Mino Province, and was the location of a  shōen controlled by Enryaku-ji during the Heian and Kamakura periods,  During the Edo period, it was mostly controlled by Ōgaki Domain. During the post-Meiji restoration cadastral reforms, the area was organised into Anpachi District, Gifu, and the village of Gōdo was established with the creation of the modern municipalities system on April 1, 1889. Gōdo was raised to town status on August 5, 1892. The town annexed the village of Kita-Hirano on April 1, 1950 and the villages of Shimomiya and Minami-Hirano on April 1, 1954. The town borders expanded on April 1, 1960 by the annexation of the Nishizakura section of the neighboring town Ōno. In 2004, a proposed merger with the neighboring city of Ōgaki was rejected by a referendum.

Economy
The mainstay of the local economy is agriculture (rice, vegetables, dairy, poultry), and light industry  (computer related products, dairy products, chemicals).

Education
Gōdo has four public elementary schools and two public middle schools operated by the town government. The town does not have a high school.

Transportation

Railway
 Yōrō Railway Yōrō Line
 -  -

Highway
The town is not served by any national highways.

References

External links

 

 
Towns in Gifu Prefecture